VAP-61 was a Heavy Photographic Squadron of the U.S. Navy. Originally established as VP-61 on 20 January 1951, it was redesignated VJ-61 on 5 March 1952. It was redesignated as VAP-61 in April 1956, redesignated as VCP-61 on 1 July 1959 and redesignated as VAP-61 on 1 July 1961. The squadron was disestablished on 1 July 1971.

Operational history

March 1951: A squadron detachment was ordered to photograph the Mississippi Delta area and adjacent coastline.
May 1951: A squadron detachment was ordered to Alaska in connection with mapping Alaska for the U.S. Army Map Service.
May 1964: Squadron detachments began flying photographic reconnaissance missions from carriers operating in the South China Sea over Laos and South Vietnam as part of Yankee Team Operations.
2–5 August 1964: Squadron detachments aboard carriers provided photo reconnaissance support during the Gulf of Tonkin Incident.
1965: Squadron detachments continued to operate from carriers in the South China Sea; providing photo-reconnaissance support for Yankee Team Operations, Operation Rolling Thunder and Operation Market Time.
7 August 1966: The squadron flew its first night combat infrared reconnaissance mission over North Vietnam interdicting truck convoys at night.
20 August 1968: A squadron RA-3B on an R&R flight to Bangkok went out of control at 25,000 ft and the 3 passengers bailed out. Only two parachutes were observed and two men were recovered. At 10,000 ft the pilot recovered control of the RA-3B and flew it back to Da Nang Air Base. The other passenger Photographer 2nd Class Charles Lindbloom from VAP-62 was killed in action, body not recovered.
31 January 1970: The squadron’s participation in Yankee Team Operations came to an end after 68 months.

Home port assignments
The squadron was assigned to these home ports, effective on the dates shown:
 NAS Miramar – 20 January 1951
 NAS Agana – June 1956

Aircraft assignment
The squadron first received the following aircraft on the dates shown:
PB4Y-1P/P4Y-1P Liberator - January 1951
AJ-2P Savage - 14 September 1952
F8U-1P Crusader - August 1959
A3D-2P/RA-3B Skywarrior - September 1959
KA3B Skywarrior - 26 December 1963

See also
 Reconnaissance aircraft
 List of inactive United States Navy aircraft squadrons
 History of the United States Navy

References

External links

Wikipedia articles incorporating text from the Dictionary of American Naval Aviation Squadrons
Fleet air reconnaissance squadrons of the United States Navy